The 1996 season was Shimizu S-Pulse's fifth season in existence and their fourth season in the J1 League. The club also competed in the Emperor's Cup, the J.League Cup, and the Suntory Cup. The team finished the season tenth in the league and won the J.League Cup.

Review and events

League results summary

League results by round

Competitions

Domestic results

J.League

Emperor's Cup

J.League Cup

Suntory Cup

Player statistics

 † player(s) joined the team after the opening of this season.

Transfers

In:

Out:

Transfers during the season

In
 Hiroki Matsubara (from Ritsumeikan University)
 Fernando Nicolas Oliva (from Atlético Central Córdoba on March)

Out
 Marcelo (on July)
 Toninho

Awards

J.League Rookie of the Year:  Toshihide Saito

References

Other pages
 J. League official site
 Shimizu S-Pulse official site

Shimizu S-Pulse
Shimizu S-Pulse seasons